Junior Castillo (born May 10, 1986 in Higüey) is a Dominican Republic boxer who competes as a middleweight. At the 2012 Summer Olympics he was defeated in the heats of the Men's middleweight by Anthony Ogogo.

References

External links 
 

1986 births
Living people
Olympic boxers of the Dominican Republic
Boxers at the 2012 Summer Olympics
Middleweight boxers
Dominican Republic male boxers